Simon Shaps (born 10 September 1956) is a British television executive and producer, and former ITV director of television.

Early life and career
Shaps attended Haberdashers' Aske's Boys' School in Elstree, Hertfordshire and studied English at Magdalene College, Cambridge.

He began his career as a reporter on the Cambridge Evening News in 1979; in a speech to the Royal Television Society (RTS) he described this time as "a two-year stint in Siberia".

In 1982 he joined Thames Television as a researcher, having been turned down by the BBC for a job as a graduate trainee. As a television producer he produced Strange but True? and The One That Got Away.

In 1997 he became director of programmes at Granada Television in Manchester. In 2001 he became Managing director of Granada content. In November 2003 he became chief executive of Granada Television.

He became ITV director of television on 21 September 2005, leaving in 2008. Under his leadership, ITV revived its programme line-up, unceremoniously dispensing with many long-running programmes.

Personal life
He is married with three children.

See also
 List of Old Haberdashers

References

External links
 

1956 births
Living people
Alumni of Magdalene College, Cambridge
British television executives
British television producers
People educated at Haberdashers' Boys' School
ITV people